Séance is an album by German melodic black metal band Dark Fortress. Alex Krull mastered the album in the Mastersound Studios and the whole layout of the booklet was designed by Travis Smith.

Track listing
 "Ghastly Indoctrination" – 7:39  
 "CataWomb" – 6:41 
 "Requiem Grotesque" – 6:50
 "While They Sleep" – 7:11 
 "To Harvest the Artefacts of Mockery" – 4:11 
 "Poltergeist" – 5:56 
 "Revolution: Vanity" – 5:14 
 "Incide" – 5:20 
 "Shardfigures" – 6:22 
 "Insomnia" – 6:34

Notes
  Morean, who joined the band in 2007 after Azathoth left that same year, composed the track Incide. He was not an official band member at the time, but the band had a good relationship with him.
  Morean also arranged the string section used in the song While They Sleep.

Personnel
 Azathoth – vocals
 Asvargr – guitar
 V. Santura – guitar, mixing, vocals on While They Sleep
 Draug – bass guitar
 Paymon – keyboard
 Seraph – drums, vocals on Ghastly Indoctrination and While They Sleep

Other credits
 Alex Krull – mastering
 Morean – string arrangements
 Florian Rhöse – drums co-engineering
 Jonas Baumgartl – cello
 Lisa Kraus – viola
 Loretta Loibl – violin
 Thomas Tezzele – double bass
 Christophe Szpajdel – logo

External links
 Encyclopaedia Metallum
 Various facts at Discogs

References

2006 albums
Dark Fortress albums
Century Media Records albums